Dormi, dormi, bel Bambin is an Italian Christmas carol. It is particularly popular in Corsica. The carol is supposed to be a cradle song of the Virgin Mary.

See also
List of Christmas carols

Sources

Christmas carols
Year of song missing
Songwriter unknown
Corsican music